The Protva is a river in Moscow and Kaluga Oblasts in Russia, left tributary of the Oka. The Protva freezes up in early December and stays icebound until early April. Its main tributary is the Luzha. The towns of Vereya, Borovsk, Protvino and Obninsk are located on the shores of the Protva.

References

Rivers of Kaluga Oblast
Rivers of Moscow Oblast